"Bostich" is a song by Swiss synthpop band Yello, released in 1981. It is the third and final single to be released from their debut studio album Solid Pleasure. "Bostich" appears on the band's compilation album Essential Yello. The song peaked at number 23 on the Billboard dance chart.

The song's title is a reference to stapler manufacturer Bostitch; in Swiss German, the verb "bostitchen" itself is a generic trademark for stapling.

Track listing

Personnel 
Yello
 Electronics, backing vocals – Boris Blank
 Tape – Carlos Peron
 Vocals – Dieter Meier
 Percussion - Beat Ash

Production
 Producer, engineer –  Boris Blank, Ursri Weber

References

External links
Yello - Bostich (12" single), Discogs.

1981 songs
1981 singles
Yello songs
Vertigo Records singles
Songs written by Boris Blank (musician)
Songs written by Dieter Meier